Rodrigo Pereira Calaça (born January 25, 1981 in Catalão), is a Brazilian goalkeeper. He currently plays for Juazeirense, and previously played at Goiás for over ten years.

Titles
Goiás State League: 2000, 2002, 2003, 2006, 2009
Center West Cup: 2000, 2001, 2002
Campeonato Brasiliense: 2019

External links
 sambafoot
 CBF
 Guardian Stats Centre
 zerozero.pt
 goiasesporteclube.com

1981 births
Living people
Brazilian footballers
Goiás Esporte Clube players
Association football goalkeepers
Sport Club do Recife players
Associação Portuguesa de Desportos players
Sportspeople from Goiás